Devathai is a 1997 Indian Tamil-language fantasy film written, directed and produced by Nassar. The film stars himself, Keerthi Reddy (in her Tamil film debut) and Vineeth, while the film's score and soundtrack are composed by Ilaiyaraaja. The film released in June 1997 to positive reviews, however it ended up becoming an average grosser at the box office. The film's story was loosely based on 1992 American movie Bram Stoker's Dracula and novel of the same name.

Plot
The film centres on Shashanka, a dacoit who starts off as a Robin Hood type before lapsing into mass, and merciless, killings. He then falls in love with the daughter of one of his captives, only to be spurned. The dejected dacoit commits suicide. Years later, the girl is reborn in Dubai, grows up, falls in love and is on the verge of getting married when she makes a visit to India, to the family's ancestral home. Disturbing thoughts, hallucinations and meetings with a bearded man who is, though she doesn't know it just yet, Shashanka reborn, mark the visit. The rest of the story traces Shashanka's intentions of trying to convince the girl of their previous life characters.

Cast 

Nassar as Shasangan
Keerthi Reddy as Kayal
Vineeth as Umapathi
Janagaraj as Keerthi's father
Thalaivasal Vijay as Kamusigha
K. B. Mohan
Sathyapriya
Kalairani
Mu Ramaswamy

Production

After the failure of his debut directorial venture, Avatharam, Nassar claimed he "remembered a story I [he] had first heard as a child, it stayed with me and gave me the creative seed for this film", talking about how he picked to make a story on reincarnation. Nassar struggled to find an apt actress to play the lead role and even advertised in newspapers asking potential actors to audition, before finding and finalising on Telugu actress Keerthi Reddy. Vineeth was signed on for a supporting role, while professor of Drama, M. Ramasamy was also given a role. Nassar himself portrayed a prominent character in the film. He recalled that a famous actor of that time was signed to do the role in the film but he backed out in the last minute, fearing his image and also the actor wanted some changes in the script, which Nassar was not willing to do.

The authorities in Dubai initially were reluctant to let Nassar shoot his film there, as a previous Tamil filmmaker had depicted the city in poor light. Eventually the actor-director was able to convince them to let him shoot his film in the city after providing them with an entire script.

The art director, Trotsky Marudu, revealed that he worked very hard during the portions in the first 30 minutes of the film, with the sets, costumes, weapons, make-up having to be similar to conditions 300 years ago. Nassar and Marudhu further proceeded to incorporate graphics into the film, using "Flint" software, to create several special effects scenes in the film.

Release
The film opened to predominantly positive reviews, with critics praising its off-beat theme. Indolink.com cited that "don't miss the first 30-45 minutes of the movie. Excellent special effects, editing and direction makes this movie worth watching". About Keerthi Reddy, the critic added that "without doubt she is the best newcomer among the many who have turned up in Tamil movies in recent times", while it was added that the reviewer "felt that Nasser gave an exceptionally good performance". K. Vijiyan of New Straits Times wrote, "It is hoped [Nassar] would come out with a better movie next time. Or better still, he should dedicate himself fulltime to acting where his talents seem to lie." Kalki praised Nassar for making a fantasy film with realism and also for depicting ancient period with realism.

The film became a financial failure for Nassar, prompting the actor to sign many films in a rush to pay off his debts. The actor revealed that his immediate busy schedule had subsequently cost him a role in Aamir Khan's critically acclaimed Lagaan (2001).

Soundtrack

The soundtrack of the film was composed by Ilaiyaraaja, was well received by the audience. The lyrics were written by Arivumathi, K. A. Gunasekaran, Kamakodiyan and Ponniyin Selvan.

References

External links

1997 films
Films scored by Ilaiyaraaja
1990s Tamil-language films
Films based on Indian folklore
Films about reincarnation
Indian romantic thriller films
1990s romantic thriller films
1990s supernatural thriller films
Indian supernatural thriller films